Burnley Belvedere Football Club is a football club based in Burnley, Lancashire, England.

History
The club was established in 1881. In 1979–80, the club entered the FA Vase for the first time, going on to enter the competition in each of the next eight seasons. In 1999, they joined Division Two of the West Lancashire League. After winning the division at the first attempt, they were promoted to Division One. The club finished bottom of Division One in 2004–05, resulting in relegation back to Division Two. They left the league at the end of the 2008–09 season.

Burnley Belvedere later joined the East Lancashire League, and were Division One champions in 2016–17. They retained the league title the following season, after which they moved up to the Premier Division of the Lancashire Amateur League.

Honours
West Lancashire League
Division Two champions 1999–2000
East Lancashire League
Division One champions 2016–17, 2017–18

Records
Best FA Vase performance: First round, 1979–80, 1985–86

References

External links

Football clubs in England
Football clubs in Lancashire
1881 establishments in England
Association football clubs established in 1881
West Lancashire Football League